Orthoclydon chlorias is a species of moth in the family Geometridae. It is endemic to New Zealand.

Taxonomy
This species was first described by Edward Meyrick in 1883 under the name Larentia chlorias. Meyrick went on to give a more detailed description of the species in 1884. In 1903 George Hudson, thinking he was describing the species for the first time, also named the species Venusia princeps. In 1905 Meyrick synonymised this name and placed this species within the genus Xanthorhoe. In 1928 Hudson illustrated and discussed this species in his book The Butterflies and Moths of New Zealand under its current name Orthoclydon chlorias.

Description
Meyrick described the species as follows:

Distribution
O. chlorias is endemic to New Zealand. Meyrick first collected the species at near Castle Hill. The moth has subsequently also been found at Mount Hector, Tararua range, Dun Mountain, and at Dunedin.

Plant hosts
O. chlorias larvae feed on the leaves of Gaultheria species.

References

Moths of New Zealand
Moths described in 1883
Cidariini
Endemic fauna of New Zealand
Taxa named by Edward Meyrick
Endemic moths of New Zealand